Philip III of Falkenstein (1257 – 9 February 1322), Lord of Falkenstein, Münzenberg and Lich, Hesse was a member of the Lich line of the Falkenstein dynasty, son of , Lord of Münzenberg and Falkenstein, who founded the Lich line, and his wife Mechtild of  (1238 – 3 December 1288).

Ancestry 

Lordship 
Before 1295, his father Werner I had moved his seat away from Münzenburg to the nearby town of Lich after he had inherited another part of the Münzenberg Inheritance. Philip had a large water castle built at Lich, in order to protect the spot where the  road crossed the Wetter river. While in the service of the German King Albert I, the king promoted Lich to the rank of town by a charter of 10 March 1300 – it had already been referred to as "oppidum nostrum" (our town) in 1297.

Family 
They had the following children:
 Elisabeth of Falkenstein (died 1 September 1328), who married Raugrave Henry III of Neuenbaumburg
 Isengard of Falkenstein (1280–1326), who married Luther of Isenburg-Grenzau
 Werner of Falkenstein (died 1309)
 Ulrich II of Falkenstein (died 1307)

He married, secondly, in 1303, Luckard(e) of Isenburg (died 11 October 1309), an illegitimate daughter of Ludwig I of Isenburg von Cleeburg, Burggrave of Gelnhausen, with whom he had the following children:
 Elsa of Falkenstein (died 1317)

Most of the tombs of the Lich line of the Falkenstein family are located in the Marienstiftskirche in Lich.

References

Bibliography 
 Anette Löffler: Die Herren und Grafen von Falkenstein (Taunus). Studien zur Territorial- und Besitzgeschichte, zur reichspolitischen Stellung und zur Genealogie eines führenden Ministerialengeschlechts 1255-1418. Volume 99. Self-published by the Hessischen Historischen Kommission Darmstadt und der Historischen Kommission für Hessen, 1994.
 Johann Friedrich Böhmer: Regesten zur Geschichte der Mainzer Erzbischöfe: Von Konrad I. bis Heinrich II. 1161 – 1288.  1886.
 Licher Heimatbuch., edited by the Commission for the Licher Heimatbuch. Lich 1950.
 Licher Heimatbuch. Die Kernstadt und ihre Stadtteile. Edited by Paul Görlich and the Magistrat der Stadt Lich 1989.
 Johann Georg Lehmann: "Urkundliche Geschichte der Herren und Grafen von Falkenstein am Donnersberg in der Pfalz" in: "Mitteilungen des Historischen Vereins der Pfalz", Band 3, 1872, Daniel Kranzbühler'sche Buchdruckerei, Speyer
 Adolph Köllner: "Versuch einer Geschichte der Grafschaft Falkenstein" in "Geschichte der Herrschaft Kirchheim-Boland und Stauf", 1854, Wiesbaden

External links 
 G. Simon: Die Geschichte des reichsständischen Hauses Ysenburg und Büdingen. Frankfurt/Main, Brönner 1865
 Heinrich Leo: Vorlesungen über die Geschichte des deutschen Volkes und Reiches, Band 4. Halle 1865.
 Ferdinand August Dommerich: Urkundliche Geschichte der allmähligen Vergrößerung der Grafschaft Hanau von der Mitte des 13. Jahrhunderts bis zum Aussterben des gräflichen Hauses im Jahre 1736. Hanau 1860
 Das Marienstift und seine Bedeutung in der Reformation. (PDF-File; 60 kB)
 Stammbaum der Grafen von Katzenelnbogen
 Medieval Ashkenaz. Corpus der Quellen zur Geschichte der Juden im spätmittelalterlichen Reich.
 Philipp III of Falkenstein, in "Our Royal, Titled, Noble, and Commoner Ancestors & Cousins"
 Philipp III. von Falkenstein, in Geneanet
 Philipp III. von Falkenstein, in Genealogie Eberhard
 Philipp III. von Falkenstein, in Gebdas
 Philipp III. von Falkenstein, in GeneAll.net

Counts of the Holy Roman Empire
People from Lich, Germany
1322 births
1322 deaths